Sxc or SXC may refer to:

stock.xchng, photo-sharing website
.sxc, OpenOffice.org spreadsheet file extension